Debraj Roy (born 9 December 1950) is an Indian actor who is known for his work in Bengali cinema. He made his big screen debut with Satyajit Ray's Pratidwandi (1970) and grabbed wider attention for his role in Mrinal Sen's Calcutta 71 (1971).

Filmography

 Bhoot Adbhoot (2014)
 Birodhi (2013)
 Chaap – The Pressure (2013)
 Ekti Muhurter Jonyo (2013)
 Panga Nibi Na Shala (2013)
 Kaal Madhumaas (2013)
 Honeymoon (2013)
 Aami Montri Hobo (2011)
 Dujone Milbo Abaar (2011)
 Kapurush Mahapurush (2011)
 Ashay Bhalobasay (2011)
 Run (2011)
 Preyashi (2010)
 Love Circus (2010)
 Smriti Katha Bole (2010)
 Jodi Kagoje Lekho Naam (2009)
 Raktanjali (2009)
 Moner Ajante (2009)
 Jekhane Ashray (2009)
 Shibaji (2008)
 Barodir Bramhachari Baba Lokenath (2007)
 Rudra The Fire (2007)
 Sri Ramkrishna Vivekananda (2007)
 Asha (2006)
 Til Theke Tal (2005)
 Mej Didi (2003)
 Inquilaab (2002)
 Aghat (2001)

References

External links
 

1950 births
Living people
Bengali Hindus
Indian male film actors
Male actors in Bengali cinema
Indian Hindus
Male actors from Kolkata
21st-century Indian male actors